Steve Kuhn (born March 24, 1938) is an American jazz pianist, composer, arranger, bandleader, and educator.

Biography
Kuhn was born in New York City, New York, to Carl and Stella Kuhn (née Kaufman), and was raised in Newton, Massachusetts. His parents were Hungarian-Jewish immigrants. At the age of five, he began studying piano under Boston piano teacher Margaret Chaloff, mother of jazz baritone saxophonist Serge Chaloff, who taught him the "Russian style" of piano playing. At an early age he began improvising classical music. As a teenager, he appeared in jazz clubs in the Boston area with Chet Baker, Coleman Hawkins, Vic Dickenson, and Serge Chaloff.

After graduating from Harvard, he attended the Lenox School of Music where he was associated with Ornette Coleman, Don Cherry, and Gary McFarland. The school's faculty included Bill Evans, George Russell, Gunther Schuller, and the members of the Modern Jazz Quartet. This allowed Kuhn to play, study, and create with some of the most forward-thinking innovators of jazz improvisation and composition; it culminated with his joining trumpeter Kenny Dorham's group for an extended time and (briefly) John Coltrane's quartet at New York's Jazz Gallery club.

Kuhn also has appeared with Stan Getz, Art Farmer, Oliver Nelson, Gary McFarland, Ron Carter, Scott LaFaro, Harvie Swartz, vocalist Sheila Jordan, Billy Drummond, David Finck, and Miroslav Vitous. From 1967 to 1971 Kuhn moved to Stockholm, Sweden where he worked with his own trio throughout Europe. In 1971 Kuhn moved back to New York City and formed a quartet but continued doing European gigs and appearing at the Newport Jazz Festival.

In his early years, Kuhn was known as an avant-garde jazz pianist. He was associated with bassist Steve Swallow and drummer Pete La Roca during the 1960s on several notable recordings: Three Waves, under Kuhn's leadership; Basra, under La Roca's leadership, which also featured Joe Henderson; and Sing Me Softly of the Blues under flugelhornist Art Farmer's leadership. Also notable was Kuhn's inclusion in the quartet on the landmark recording Sound Pieces led by saxophonist, composer, and arranger Oliver Nelson and including Ron Carter on bass and Grady Tate on drums. Among other critically acclaimed recordings there was The October Suite composed by Gary McFarland for Kuhn and an ensemble which included strings, woodwinds, and reeds. The Promises Kept album features Kuhn's compositions, piano, and strings.

For decades, Steve Kuhn has led all-star trios that have included such players as bassists Ron Carter and David Finck, and drummers Al Foster, Jack DeJohnette, and Joey Baron. He has had several live recordings made in some of New York's leading jazz clubs. Kuhn is also the composer of the jazz standard "The Saga of Harrison Crabfeathers".

In late 2022, Kuhn announced that he had retired from touring.

Discography

As leader/co-leader

Compilations 
 Life's Backward Glances (ECM, 2009) – Solo Piano, Trios, and Quartets with Steve Slagle or Sheila Jordan
 Essential Best (Venus, 2011)

As sideman 
With  Stan Getz
 1961: Recorded Fall 1961 with Bob Brookmeyer (Verve, 1961)
 1961: At Birdland 1961 (Fresh Sound, 2012)
 1963: Stan Getz With Guest Artist Laurindo Almeida with Laurindo Almeida (Verve, 1966)With Steve Swallow 1979: Home (ECM, 1980)
 1991: Swallow (XtraWATT, 1992)With others' David Darling, Cycles (ECM, 1982) – recorded in 1981
 Kenny Dorham, Jazz Contemporary (Time, 1960)
 Art Farmer, Sing Me Softly of the Blues (Atlantic, 1965)
 Don Heckman and Ed Summerlin, The Don Heckman–Ed Summerlin Improvisational Jazz Workshop (Ictus, 1967) – recorded in 1965–66
 Jameszoo, Fool (Brainfeeder, 2016)
 Sheila Jordan, Jazz Child (HighNote, 1997)
 Lee Konitz, Pony Poindexter, Phil Woods and Leo Wright, Alto Summit (MPS, 1968)
 Karin Krog, We Could Be Flying (Polydor, 1975)
 Charles McPherson, But Beautiful (Vinus, 2004) – recorded in 2003
 Bob Mintzer, Bop Boy with Eddie Gomez and Steve Gadd (Explore, 2002)
 Tisziji Munoz, Incomprehensibly Gone (Anami, 2013)
 Oliver Nelson, Sound Pieces (Impulse!, 1967) – recorded in 1966
 John Rae, Opus de Jazz 2 (Savoy, 1960)
 Pete La Roca, Basra (Blue Note, 1965)
 Pee Wee Russell and Henry "Red" Allen, The College Concert (Impulse!, 1966) – live
 Tessa Souter, Beyond The Blue'' (Vinus, 2012) – recorded in 2011

References

External links
 Steve Kuhn discography at JazzDiscography.com
 Steve Kuhn on ECM Records
 Steve Kuhn at SunnysideRecords.com
 Interview with Steve Kuhn
 Steve Kuhn in-studio performance from WGBH Radio Boston
 NY Times -- Steve Kuhn: Revisiting an Old Boss Named John Coltrane
 Steve Kuhn Interview NAMM Oral History Library (1997)

1938 births
Living people
20th-century American male musicians
20th-century American pianists
21st-century American male musicians
21st-century American pianists
American jazz pianists
American male pianists
Free jazz pianists
Harvard University alumni
American male jazz musicians
Cobblestone Records artists
ECM Records artists
Fresh Sounds Records artists
Impulse! Records artists
Muse Records artists
Postcards Records artists
Sunnyside Records artists
Reservoir Records artists
HighNote Records artists